Saswati Sen  is an Indian dancer and choreographer, and an exponent of Kathak, an Indian classical dance form. She was a senior disciple of Pandit Birju Maharaj, and still teaches and performs at his Kalashram Institute in the Jor Bagh district of New Delhi.

Saswati Sen received a Sangeet Natak Akademi Award in 2004.

Notes

External links 
 http://kathakensemble.com/tributes/tributes-2/saswati/
 http://www.newyorker.com/magazine/2006/10/23/hard-and-fast 
 http://www.livemint.com/Leisure/jE2IIBSRCynFgmGlIvlTRJ/A-disciples-tribute-to-Pandit-Birju-Maharaj.html

Indian female classical dancers
Kathak exponents
Living people
Recipients of the Sangeet Natak Akademi Award
Performers of Indian classical dance
Place of birth missing (living people)
Year of birth missing (living people)